Samuel Andrews may refer to:
 Sam Andrews (born 1982), English cricketer
 Samuel G. Andrews (1796–1863), American politician
 Samuel James Andrews (1817–1906), American clergyman
 Samuel Andrews (chemist) (1836–1904), English inventor
 Samuel Paull Andrews (1836–1916), New Zealand politician

See also
 Samuel Andrew (1656–1738), American Congregational clergyman and educator